Kish (also Romanized as Kīsh ) is a coastal city and capital of Kish District, in Bandar Lengeh County, Hormozgan Province, Iran. At the 2006 census, its population was 20,667, in 6,163 families.

The city is on Kish Island, a special zone of Iran. The island is served by Kish International Airport, and has a visa policy separate from the Iranian mainland, such that foreign tourists can obtain a visa on arrival.

Gallery

References 

Cities in Hormozgan Province
Populated coastal places in Iran
Populated places in Bandar Lengeh County
Port cities and towns in Iran
Port cities and towns of the Persian Gulf

tr:Cinah